The Society of Artists of Great Britain was founded in London in May 1761 by an association of artists in order to provide a venue for the public exhibition of recent work by living artists, such as was having success in the long-established Paris salons. Leading members seceded from the society in 1768, a move leading directly to the formation of the Royal Academy of Arts. The society was dissolved 1791 after years of decline.

History 

The Society of Artists of Great Britain began in 1760 as a loose association of artists, including Joshua Reynolds and Francis Hayman, who wanted greater control by artists over exhibitions of their work previously organised by William Shipley's Society of Arts (founded in 1754). The new society organised their first exhibition in April 1760 and over one thousand visitors per day attended. The following year they held their second exhibition at Christopher Cock's Auction Rooms in Spring Gardens, Charing Cross, and "In a conspicuous gesture they called themselves the Society of Artists of Great Britain to emphasise their identity with the 'nation' and to announce a clear split with Shipley's faction." Some 13,000 people bought a copy of the catalogue for the 1761 exhibition which featured a frontispiece designed by William Hogarth depicting Britannia watering three trees marked Painting, Sculpture and Architecture.

In 1765, the Society, then comprising 211 members, obtained a Royal Charter as the "Incorporated Society of Artists of Great Britain".

Reynolds would later be a founder of the Royal Academy of Arts, after an unseemly leadership dispute between two leading architects, Sir William Chambers and James Paine had split the Society. Paine won, but Chambers used his strong connections with George III to create the new body – the Royal Academy of Arts was formally launched in 1769. However, the Society of Artists of Great Britain continued its schedule of exhibitions until 1791, while those who remained with the older "Society of Arts" now called themselves the "Free Society of Artists" (1761–1783).

See also 
 Society of Artists (Australia)

References and sources 

 References

 Sources
 

Defunct art museums and galleries in London
British artist groups and collectives
1761 establishments in Great Britain
1791 disestablishments in Great Britain
1761 in art
Art societies